Ronald Earl Willis (July 12, 1943 – November 21, 1977) was a professional baseball player. He was a pitcher over parts of five seasons (1966–1970) with the St. Louis Cardinals, Houston Astros and San Diego Padres. Willis was a member of the 1967 World Series champion Cardinals. He was dealt from the Cardinals to the Padres for Bobby Etheridge before the trade deadline on June 15, 1970. For his career he compiled an 11–12 record with a 3.32 earned run average and 128 strikeouts in 188 appearances, all as a relief pitcher.

In 238.1 innings of work, he handled 80 chances (24 putouts, 56 assists) without an error for a perfect 1.000 fielding percentage.

Willis was born in Willisville, Tennessee and later died in Memphis, Tennessee at the age of 34 from a brain tumor.

References

External links

1943 births
1977 deaths
Baseball players from Tennessee
Major League Baseball pitchers
Houston Astros players
St. Louis Cardinals players
San Diego Padres players
Brunswick Cardinals players
Raleigh Cardinals players
Johnson City Cardinals players
Indianapolis Indians players
Tulsa Oilers (baseball) players
Arkansas Travelers players
Billings Mustangs players
Deaths from brain cancer in the United States